Sicily is the largest and most populous island in the Mediterranean Sea and one of the 20 regions of Italy. The Strait of Messina divides it from the region of Calabria in Southern Italy. It is one of the five Italian autonomous regions and is officially referred to as Regione Siciliana. The region has 5 million inhabitants. Its capital city is Palermo.

Sicily is in the central Mediterranean Sea, south of the Italian Peninsula in continental Europe, from which it is separated by the narrow Strait of Messina. The island has a typical Mediterranean climate.

The earliest archaeological evidence of human activity on the island dates from as early as 12,000 BC. By around 750 BC, Sicily had three Phoenician and a dozen Greek colonies and it was later the site of the Sicilian Wars and the Punic Wars. After the end of the Roman province of Sicilia with the fall of the Roman Empire in the 5th century AD, Sicily was ruled during the Early Middle Ages by the Vandals, the Ostrogoths, the Byzantine Empire, and the Emirate of Sicily. The Norman conquest of southern Italy led to the creation of the County of Sicily in 1071, that was succeeded by Kingdom of Sicily, a state that existed from 1130 until 1816. Later, it was unified under the House of Bourbon with the Kingdom of Naples as the Kingdom of the Two Sicilies. The island became part of Italy in 1860 following the Expedition of the Thousand, a revolt led by Giuseppe Garibaldi during the Italian unification, and a plebiscite. Sicily was given special status as an autonomous region on 15 May 1946, 18 days before the Italian institutional referendum of 1946.

Sicily has a rich and unique culture, especially with regard to the arts, music, literature, cuisine, and architecture.

Geography

Sicily has a roughly triangular shape, earning it the name Trinacria.

The terrain of inland Sicily is mostly hilly and is intensively cultivated wherever possible. Along the northern coast, the mountain ranges of Madonie, Nebrodi, and Peloritani, are an extension of the mainland Apennines. The cone of Mount Etna dominates the eastern coast. In the southeast lie the lower Hyblaean Mountains, . The mines of the Enna and Caltanissetta districts were part of a leading sulphur-producing area throughout the 19th century, but have declined since the 1950s.

Sicily and its surrounding small islands have some highly active volcanoes. This is due to Sicily being geographically on the northern edge of the African continental plate. Mount Etna is the largest active volcano in Europe and casts black ash over the island with its recurrent eruptions. It is the highest mountain in Italy south of the Alps. This makes it the largest of the three active volcanoes in Italy, being about two and a half times the height of the next largest, Mount Vesuvius. In Greek mythology, the deadly monster Typhon was trapped under the mountain by Zeus, the god of the sky. Mount Etna is widely regarded as a cultural symbol and icon of Sicily.

The Aeolian Islands in the Tyrrhenian Sea, to the northeast of mainland Sicily form a volcanic complex.

The three volcanoes of Vulcano, Stromboli and Lipari are also active, although the latter is usually dormant. Off the southern coast of Sicily, the underwater volcano of Ferdinandea, which is part of the larger Empedocles volcano, last erupted in 1831. It is located between the coast of Agrigento and the island of Pantelleria (which itself is a dormant volcano).

From a geographical perspective, also forming a part of Sicily is the Maltese Archipelago, the islands home to the republic of Malta.

The autonomous region also includes several neighbouring islands: the Aegadian Islands, the Aeolian Islands, Pantelleria and Lampedusa.

Rivers

Several rivers drain the island, most of which flow through the central area and enter the sea at the south of the island. The Salso flows through parts of Enna and Caltanissetta before entering the Mediterranean Sea at the port of Licata. To the east, the Alcantara flows through the province of Messina and enters the sea at Giardini Naxos, and the Simeto, which flows into the Ionian Sea south of Catania. Other important rivers on the island are the Belice and Platani in the southwest.

Climate

Sicily has a typical Mediterranean climate with mild and wet winters and hot, dry summers with changeable intermediate seasons. On the coasts, especially in the southwest, the climate is affected by the African currents and summers can be hot.

Snow falls above 900–1000 metres, but it can fall in the hills. The interior mountains, especially Nebrodi, Madonie, and Etna, enjoy a mountain climate, with heavy snowfalls during winter. The summit of Mount Etna is usually snow-capped from October to May.

In the summer, the sirocco, the wind from the Sahara can be felt. Rainfall is scarce, and in some provinces a water crisis can occur.

Total precipitation is highly variable, generally increasing with elevation. In general, the southern and southeast coast receives the least rainfall (less than ), and the northern and northeastern highlands the most (over ).

Flora and fauna

Sicily is an often-quoted example of man-made deforestation, which has occurred since Roman times when the island was turned into an agricultural region. This gradually dried the climate, leading to a decline in rainfall and the drying of rivers. The central and southwest provinces are practically devoid of forest. In Northern Sicily, there are three important forests; near Mount Etna, in the Nebrodi Mountains and in the Bosco della Ficuzza Natural Reserve near Palermo. The Hundred Horse Chestnut, in Sant'Alfio, on the eastern slopes of Mount Etna, is the largest and oldest known chestnut tree in the world at 2,000 – 4,000 years old.

Sicily has a wide variety of fauna. Species include the European wildcat, red fox, least weasel, pine marten, roe deer, fallow deer,wild boar, crested porcupine, European hedgehog, common toad, Vipera aspis, golden eagle, peregrine falcon, Eurasian hoopoe and black-winged stilt. The Sicilian wolf (Canis lupus cristaldii) was an endemic wolf subspecies that was driven to extinction in the 20th century.

The Zingaro Natural Reserve is one of the best examples of unspoiled coastal wilderness in Sicily.

Surrounding waters including the Strait of Messina are home to varieties of birds and marine life, including larger species such as greater flamingo and fin whale.

History

The name Sicilia was given to the Roman province in 241 BC. It is derived from the name of the Sikeloi, who inhabited the eastern part of the island.

The ancient name of the island is Trinacria (Greek Τρινακρία "having three headlands") for its triangular shape, likely a re-interpretation of earlier (Homeric) Thrinacia. The Greek name was rendered as Trīnācrĭa in classical Latin (Virgil, Ovid).

Prehistory

The original classical-era inhabitants of Sicily comprised three defined groups of the ancient peoples of Italy. The most prominent and by far the earliest of these, the Sicani, who (Thucydides writes) arrived from the Iberian Peninsula (perhaps Catalonia). Some modern scholars, however, suggest classifying the Sicani as possibly an Illyrian tribe. Important historical evidence has been discovered in the form of cave drawings by the Sicani, dated from the end of the Pleistocene epoch around 8000 BC. The arrival of the first humans on the island correlates with the extinction of the Sicilian hippopotamus and the Sicilian dwarf elephant. The Elymians, thought to have come from the area of the Aegean Sea, became the next tribe to join the Sicanians on Sicily.

Recent discoveries of dolmens on the island (dating to the second half of the third millennium BC) seem to offer new insights into the culture of primitive Sicily. The impact of at least two influences is clear: the European one coming from the Northwest, and the Mediterranean influence of an eastern heritage.

No evidence survives of warring between tribes, but the Sicanians moved eastwards when the Elymians settled in the northwest corner of the island. The Sicels are thought to have originated in Liguria; they arrived from mainland Italy in 1200 BC and forced the Sicanians to move back across Sicily and to settle in the middle of the island. Other minor Italic groups who settled in Sicily included the Ausones (Aeolian Islands, Milazzo) and the Morgetes of Morgantina.

Antiquity

The Phoenician settlements in the western part of the island predate the arrival of Greek colonists. From about 750 BC, the Greeks began to live in Sicily ( – Sikelia), establishing many significant settlements. The most important colony was in Syracuse; others grew up at Akragas, Selinunte, Gela, Himera and Zancle. The native Sicani and Sicel peoples became absorbed into the Hellenic culture with relative ease, and the area became part of Magna Graecia along with the coasts of the south of the Italian peninsula, which the Greeks had also colonised. Sicily had fertile soils, and the successful introduction of olives and grape vines fostered profitable trading. Greek culture significantly included Greek religion, and the settlers built many temples throughout Sicily, including several in the Valley of the Temples at Agrigento.

Politics on the island became intertwined with those of Greece; Syracuse became desired by the Athenians who set out on the Sicilian Expedition (415–413 BC) during the Peloponnesian War. Syracuse gained Sparta and Corinth as allies and, as a result, defeated the Athenian expedition. The victors destroyed the Athenian army and their ships, selling most of the survivors into slavery.

Greek Syracuse controlled eastern Sicily while Carthage controlled the West. The two cultures began to clash, leading to the Greek-Punic wars (between 580 and 265 BC). The Greek states had begun to make peace with the Roman Republic in 262 BC, and the Romans sought to annex Sicily as their republic's first province. Rome attacked Carthage's holdings in Sicily in the First Punic War (264 to 241 BC) and won, making Sicily the first Roman province outside of the Italian Peninsula by 242 BC.

In the Second Punic War (218 to 201 BC), the Carthaginians attempted to recapture Sicily. Some of the Greek cities on the island sided with the Carthaginians. Archimedes, who lived in Syracuse, helped the Carthaginians; Roman troops killed him after they invaded Syracuse in 213 BC. The Carthaginian attempt failed, and Rome became more unrelenting in its annihilation of the invaders; Roman consul M. Valerian told the Roman Senate in 210 BC that "no Carthaginian remains in Sicily".

As the Roman Republic's granary, Sicily ranked as an important province, divided into two quaestorships: Syracuse to the east and Lilybaeum to the west. Roman rule introduced the Latin language to the island, which underwent a slow process of latinisation but Sicily was remained largely Greek in a cultural sense and the Greek language did not become extinct on the island, facilitating its re-hellenisation under the Byzantines. The once prosperous and contented island went into sharp decline when Verres became governor of Sicily (73 to 71 BC). In 70 BC noted figure Cicero condemned the misgovernment of Verres in his oration In Verrem.

Various groups used the island as a power base at different times: slave insurgents occupied it during the First (135−132 BC) and Second (104−100 BC) Servile Wars. Sextus Pompey had his headquarters there during the Sicilian revolt of 44 to 36 BC. Christianity first appeared in Sicily during the years following AD 200; between this time and AD 313, when Emperor Constantine the Great lifted the prohibition on Christianity, a significant number of Sicilians had become martyrs, including Agatha, Christina, Lucy, and Euplius. Christianity grew rapidly in Sicily over the next two centuries. Sicily remained a Roman province for around 700 years.

Germanic rule (469–535) 
The Western Roman Empire began falling apart after the invasion of Vandals, Alans, and Sueves across the Rhine on the last day of 406. Eventually the Vandals, after roaming about western and southern Hispania (present-day Iberia) for 20 years, moved to North Africa in 429 and occupied Carthage in 439. The Franks moved south from present-day Belgium. The Visigoths moved west and eventually settled in Aquitaine in 418; the Burgundians settled in present-day Savoy in 443. 

The Vandals found themselves in a position to threaten Sicily – only 100 miles away from their North African bases. After taking Carthage, the Vandals, personally led by King Gaiseric, laid siege to Palermo in 440 as the opening act in an attempt to wrest the island from Roman rule. The Vandals made another attempt to take the island one year after the 455 sack of Rome, at Agrigento, but were defeated decisively by Ricimir in a naval victory off Corsica in 456. The island remained under Roman rule until 469. The Vandals lost possession of the island 8 years later in 477 to the East Germanic tribe of the Ostrogoths, who then controlled Italy and Dalmatia. The island was returned to the Ostrogoths by payment of tribute to their king Odoacer. He ruled Italy from 476 to 488 in the name of the Byzantine (Eastern Roman) Emperor. The Vandals kept a toehold in Lilybaeum, a port on the west coast. They lost this in 491 after making one last attempt to conquer the island from this port. The Ostrogothic conquest of Sicily (and of Italy as a whole) under Theodoric the Great began in 488. The Byzantine Emperor Zeno had appointed Theodoric as a military commander in Italy. The Goths were Germanic, but Theodoric fostered Roman culture and government and allowed freedom of religion. In 461 from the age of seven or eight until 17 or 18 Theodoric had become a Byzantine hostage; he resided in the great palace of Constantinople, was favored by Emperor Leo I and learned to read, write and do arithmetic.

Byzantine period (535–965)

After taking areas occupied by the Vandals in North Africa, Justinian I retook Italy as an ambitious attempt to recover the lost provinces in the West. The re-conquests marked an end to over 150 years of accommodationist policies with tribal invaders. His first target was Sicily (known as the Gothic War (535–554) began between the Ostrogoths and the Eastern Roman Empire, also known as the Byzantine Empire). His general Belisarius was assigned the task. Sicily was used as a base for the Byzantines to conquer the rest of Italy, with Naples, Rome, and Milan. It took five years before the Ostrogoth capital Ravenna fell in 540. However, the new Ostrogoth king Totila counterattacked, moving down the Italian peninsula, plundering and conquering Sicily in 550. Totila was defeated and killed in the Battle of Taginae by Byzantine general Narses in 552 but Italy was in ruins.

At the time of the reconquest Greek was still the predominant language spoken on the island. Sicily was invaded by the Arab forces of Caliph Uthman in 652, but the Arabs failed to make permanent gains. They returned to Syria with their booty. Raids seeking loot continued until the mid-8th century.

The Eastern Roman Emperor Constans II moved from Constantinople to Syracuse in 660. The following year he launched an assault from Sicily against the Lombard Duchy of Benevento, which occupied most of southern Italy. Rumors that the capital of the empire was to be moved to Syracuse probably cost Constans his life, as he was assassinated in 668. His son Constantine IV succeeded him. A brief usurpation in Sicily by Mezezius was quickly suppressed by this emperor. Contemporary accounts report that the Greek language was widely spoken on the island during this period. In 740 Emperor Leo III the Isaurian transferred Sicily from the jurisdiction of the church of Rome to that of Constantinople, placing the island within the eastern branch of the Church.

In 826 Euphemius, the Byzantine commander in Sicily, having apparently killed his wife, forced a nun to marry him. Emperor Michael II caught wind of the matter and ordered general Constantine to end the marriage and cut off Euphemius' head. Euphemius rose up, killed Constantine, and then occupied Syracuse; he, in turn, was defeated and driven out to North Africa. He offered the rule of Sicily to Ziyadat Allah, the Aghlabid Emir of Tunisia, in return for a position as a general and a place of safety. A Muslim army was then sent to the island consisting of Arabs, Berbers, Cretans, and Persians.

The Muslim conquest of Sicily was a see-saw affair and met with fierce resistance. It took over a century for Byzantine Sicily to be conquered; the largest city, Syracuse, held out until 878 and the Greek city of Taormina fell in 962. It was not until 965 that all of Sicily was conquered by the Arabs. In the 11th-century Byzantine armies carried out a partial reconquest of the island under George Maniakes, but it was their Norman mercenaries who would eventually complete the island's reconquest at the end of the century.

Arab Period (827–1091)

The Arabs initiated land reforms, which increased productivity and encouraged the growth of smallholdings, undermining the dominance of the latifundia. The Arabs further improved irrigation systems. The language spoken in Sicily under Arab rule was Siculo-Arabic and Arabic influence is present in some Sicilian words today. Although long extinct in Sicily, the language has developed into what is now the Maltese language on the islands of Malta today.

A description of Palermo was given by Ibn Hawqal, an Arab merchant who visited Sicily in 950. A walled suburb, called the Al-Kasr (the palace), is the centre of Palermo to this day, with the great Friday mosque on the site of the later Roman cathedral. The suburb of al-Khalisa (modern Kalsa) contained the Sultan's palace, baths, a mosque, government offices, and a private prison. Ibn Hawqal estimated there were 7,000 butchers trading in 150 shops. During Muslim rule agricultural products such as oranges, lemons, pistachios and sugarcane were brought to Sicily. Western Sicily was overwhelmingly Muslim, and contained large plantations run by slave labor, often producing sugar. Around 1050, the western half of Sicily was ethnically and culturally distinct from central and eastern Sicily. During this time, there was also a small Jewish presence in Sicily.

Palermo was initially ruled by the Aghlabids; later it was the centre of the Emirate of Sicily, which was under the nominal suzerainty of the Fatimid Caliphate. During the reign of this dynasty revolts by Byzantine Sicilians continuously occurred especially in the east where Greek-speaking Christians predominated. Parts of the island were re-occupied before revolts were quashed. Under the Arab rule the island was divided in three administrative regions, or "vals", roughly corresponding to the three "points" of Sicily: Val di Mazara in the west; Val Demone in the northeast; and Val di Noto in the southeast. As dhimmis, that is as members of a protected class of approved monotheists, the Eastern Orthodox Christians were allowed freedom of religion, but had to pay a tax, the jizya (in lieu of the obligatory alms tax, the zakat, paid by Muslims), and were restricted from active participation in public affairs. By the 11th century, the Emirate of Sicily began to fragment as intra-dynastic quarreling fractured the Muslim regime.

Norman Sicily (1038–1198)

In 1038, seventy years after losing their last cities in Sicily, the Byzantines under the Greek general George Maniakes invaded the island together with their Varangian and Norman mercenaries. Maniakes was killed in a Byzantine civil war in 1043 before completing a reconquest and the Byzantines withdrew. Later the Normans invaded in 1061 and after taking Apulia and Calabria, Roger I occupied Messina with an army of 700 knights. In 1068, Roger I was victorious at Misilmeri. Most crucial was the siege of Palermo, whose fall in 1071 eventually resulted in all Sicily coming under Norman control. The conquest was completed in 1091 when they captured Noto the last Arab stronghold. Palermo continued to be the capital under the Normans. The Normans formed a small but violent ruling class. They destroyed many of the Arab towns in Sicily, and very few physical remains survive from the Arab era.

The Norman Hauteville family, descendants of Vikings, appreciated and admired the rich and layered culture in which they now found themselves. They also introduced their own culture, customs, and politics in the region. Many Normans in Sicily adopted the habits and comportment of Muslim rulers and their Byzantine subjects in dress, language, literature, even to the extent of having palace eunuchs and, according to some accounts, a harem.

Kingdom of Sicily

While Roger I died in 1101, his wife Adelaide ruled until 1112 when their son Roger II of Sicily came of age. Having succeeded his brother Simon as Count of Sicily, Roger II was ultimately able to raise the status of the island to a kingdom in 1130, along with his other holdings, which included the Maltese Islands and the Duchies of Apulia and Calabria.

Roger II appointed the powerful Greek George of Antioch to be his "emir of emirs" and continued the syncretism of his father. During this period, the Kingdom of Sicily was prosperous and politically powerful, becoming one of the wealthiest states in all of Europe—even wealthier than the Kingdom of England.

The court of Roger II became the most luminous centre of culture in the Mediterranean, both from Europe and the Middle East, like the multi-ethnic Caliphate of Córdoba, then only just eclipsed. This attracted scholars, scientists, poets, artists, and artisans of all kinds. Laws were issued in the language of the community to whom they were addressed in Norman Sicily, at the time when the culture was still heavily Arab and Greek. Governance was by rule of law which promoted justice. Muslims, Jews, Byzantine Greeks, Lombards, and Normans worked together fairly amicably. During this time many extraordinary buildings were constructed.

However this situation changed as the Normans imported immigrants from Normandy, England, Lombardy, Piedmont, Provence and Campania to secure the island. Linguistically, the island shifted from being one-third Greek- and two-thirds Arabic-speaking at the time of the Norman conquest to becoming fully Latinised. In terms of religion the island became completely Roman Catholic (bearing in mind that until 1054 the Churches owing allegiance to the Pope and the Patriarch of Constantinople belonged to one Church); Sicily before the Norman conquest was under the Eastern Orthodox Patriarch. After Pope Innocent III made him Papal Legate in 1098, Roger I created several Catholic bishoprics while still allowing the construction of 12 Greek-speaking monasteries (the Greek language, monasteries, and 1500 parishes continued to exist until the adherents of the Greek Rite were forced in 1585 to convert to Catholicism or leave; a small pocket of Greek-speakers still live in Messina).

After a century, the Norman Hauteville dynasty died out; the last direct descendant and heir of Roger II, Constance, married Emperor Henry VI. This eventually led to the crown of Sicily being passed to the Hohenstaufen Dynasty, who were Germans from Swabia. The last of the Hohenstaufens, Frederick II, the only son of Constance, was one of the greatest and most cultured men of the Middle Ages. His mother's will had asked Pope Innocent III to undertake the guardianship of her son.  Frederick was four when at Palermo, he was crowned King of Sicily in 1198. Frederick received no systematic education and was allowed to run free in the streets of Palermo. There he picked up the many languages he heard spoken, such as Arabic and Greek, and learned some of the lore of the Jewish community. At age twelve, he dismissed Innocent's deputy regent and took over the government; at fifteen he married Constance of Aragon, and began his reclamation of the imperial crown. Subsequently, due to Muslim rebellions, Frederick II destroyed the remaining Muslim presence in Sicily, estimated at 60,000 people, moving all to the city of Lucera in Apulia between 1221 and 1226.

Conflict between the Hohenstaufen house and the Papacy led, in 1266, to Pope Innocent IV crowning the French prince Charles, count of Anjou and Provence, as the king of both Sicily and Naples.

Strong opposition to French officialdom due to mistreatment and taxation saw the local peoples of Sicily rise up, leading in 1282 to an insurrection known as the War of the Sicilian Vespers, which eventually saw almost the entire French population on the island killed. During the war, the Sicilians turned to Peter III of Aragon, son-in-law of the last Hohenstaufen king, for support after being rejected by the Pope. Peter gained control of Sicily from the French, who, however, retained control of the Kingdom of Naples. A crusade was launched in August 1283 against Peter III and the Kingdom of Aragon by Pope Martin IV (a pope from Île-de-France), but it failed. The wars continued until the peace of Caltabellotta in 1302, which saw Peter's son Frederick III recognized as the king of the Isle of Sicily, while Charles II was recognized as the king of Naples by Pope Boniface VIII. Sicily was ruled as an independent kingdom by relatives of the kings of Aragon until 1409 and then as part of the Crown of Aragon.

In October 1347, in Messina, Sicily, the Black Death first arrived in Europe.

Between the 15th-18th centuries, waves of Greeks from the Peloponnese (such as the Maniots) and Arvanites migrated to Sicily in large numbers to escape persecution after the Ottoman conquest of the Peloponnese. They brought with them Eastern Orthodoxy as well as the Greek and Arvanitika languages, once again adding onto the extensive Byzantine/Greek influence.

The onset of the Spanish Inquisition in 1492 led to Ferdinand II decreeing the expulsion of all Jews from Sicily. The eastern part of the island was hit by destructive earthquakes in 1542 and 1693. Just a few years before the latter earthquake, the island was struck by a plague. The earthquake in 1693 took an estimated 60,000 lives. There were revolts during the 17th century, but these were quelled with force, especially the revolts of Palermo and Messina. North African slave raids discouraged settlement along the coast until the 19th century. The Treaty of Utrecht in 1713 saw Sicily assigned to the House of Savoy; however, this period of rule lasted only seven years, as it was exchanged for the island of Sardinia with Emperor Charles VI of the Austrian Habsburg Dynasty.

While the Austrians were concerned with the War of the Polish Succession, a Bourbon prince, Charles from Spain was able to conquer Sicily and Naples. At first Sicily was able to remain as an independent kingdom under personal union, while the Bourbons ruled over both from Naples. However, the advent of Napoleon's First French Empire saw Naples taken at the Battle of Campo Tenese and Bonapartist King of Naples was installed. Ferdinand III, the Bourbon, was forced to retreat to Sicily which he was still in control of with the help of British naval protection.

Following this, Sicily joined the Napoleonic Wars, and subsequently the British under Lord William Bentinck established a military and diplomatic presence on the island to protect against a French invasion. After the wars were won, Sicily and Naples formally merged as the Two Sicilies under the Bourbons. Major revolutionary movements occurred in 1820 and 1848 against the Bourbon government with Sicily seeking independence; the second of which, the 1848 revolution resulted in a short period of independence for Sicily. However, in 1849 the Bourbons retook control of the island and dominated it until 1860.

Italian unification

The conquest started at Marsala, and native Sicilians joined him in the capture of the southern Italian peninsula. Garibaldi's march was completed with the siege of Gaeta, where the final Bourbons were expelled and Garibaldi announced his dictatorship in the name of Victor Emmanuel II of Kingdom of Sardinia. Sicily became part of the Kingdom of Sardinia after a referendum where more than 75% of Sicily voted in favour of the annexation on 21 October 1860 (but not everyone was allowed to vote). As a result of the proclamation of the Kingdom of Italy, Sicily became part of the kingdom on 17 March 1861.

The Sicilian economy (and the wider mezzogiorno economy) remained relatively underdeveloped after the Italian unification, in spite of the strong investments made by the Kingdom of Italy in terms of modern infrastructure, and this caused an unprecedented wave of emigration. In 1894, organisations of workers and peasants known as the Fasci Siciliani protested against the bad social and economic conditions of the island, but they were suppressed in a few days. The Messina earthquake of 28 December 1908 killed more than 80,000 people.

This period was also characterized by the first contact between the Sicilian mafia (the crime syndicate also known as Cosa Nostra) and the Italian government. The Mafia's origins are still uncertain, but it is generally accepted that it emerged in the 18th century initially in the role of private enforcers hired to protect the property of landowners and merchants from the groups of brigands (briganti) who frequently pillaged the countryside and towns. The battle against the Mafia made by the Kingdom of Italy was controversial and ambiguous. The Carabinieri (the military police of Italy) and sometimes the Italian army were often involved in fights against the mafia members, but their efforts were frequently useless because of the secret cooperation between the mafia and local government and also because of the weakness of the Italian judicial system.

20th and 21st centuries

In the 1920s, the Fascist regime began a stronger military action against the Mafia, which was led by prefect Cesare Mori, who was known as the "Iron Prefect" because of his iron-fisted campaigns. This was the first time in which an operation against the Sicilian mafia ended with considerable success. There was an Allied invasion of Sicily during World War II starting on 10 July 1943. In preparation for the invasion, the Allies revitalised the Mafia to aid them. The invasion of Sicily contributed to the 25 July crisis; in general, the Allied victors were warmly embraced by Sicily.

Italy became a Republic in 1946 and, as part of the Constitution of Italy, Sicily was one of the five regions given special status as an autonomous region. Both the partial Italian land reform and special funding from the Italian government's Cassa per il Mezzogiorno (Fund for the South) from 1950 to 1984 helped the Sicilian economy. During this period, the economic and social condition of the island was generally improved due to investments in infrastructure such as motorways and airports, and thanks to the creation of industrial and commercial areas. In the 1980s, the Mafia was weakened by another campaign led by magistrates Giovanni Falcone and Paolo Borsellino. Between 1990 and 2005, the unemployment rate fell from about 23% to 11%.

The Cosa Nostra has traditionally been the most powerful group in Sicily, especially around Palermo. A police investigation in summer 2019 also confirmed strong links between the Palermo area Sicilian Mafia and American organized crime, particularly the Gambino crime family. According to La Repubblica, "Off they go, through the streets of Passo di Rigano, Boccadifalco, Torretta and at the same time, Brooklyn, Staten Island, [and] New Jersey. Because from Sicily to the US, the old mafia has returned".

Demographics

About five million people live in Sicily, making it the fourth most populated region in Italy. In the first century after the Italian unification, Sicily had one of the most negative net migration rates among the regions of Italy because of the emigration of millions of people to Northern Italy, other European countries, North America, South America and Australia. Like the South of Italy and Sardinia, immigration to the island is very low compared to other regions of Italy because workers tend to head to Northern Italy instead, due to better employment and industrial opportunities. According to ISTAT figures from 2017, show around 175,000 immigrants out of the total 5,029,615 population; Romanians with more than 50,000 make up the most immigrants, followed by Tunisians, Moroccans, Sri Lankans, Albanians, and others mostly from Eastern Europe. As in the rest of Italy, the official language is Italian and the primary religion is Roman Catholicism.

Emigration

Sicilian emigration started shortly after the Italian unification and has not stopped ever since.
After the Italian unification, Sicily, along with the entire Italian peninsula, has also been strongly marked by coerced emigration. Most of the assets of the Kingdom of the Two Sicilies's former national bank, Banco delle Due Sicilie, were transferred to Piedmont. During the first decades of Risorgimento, a rising number of southern Italian manufactories were driven into ruin due to high taxation imposed by the central government. Furthermore, an embargo imposed on goods coming from southern Italian manufacturers, that effectively barred them from exporting to the north and abroad, were also key factors that led to further impoverishment of the entire region.

The aforementioned factors, along with a failed land reform, resulted in a never-before-seen wave of Sicilians emigrating, first to the United States between the 1880s and the 1920s, later to Northern Italy, and from the 1960s onwards also to Belgium, France, Germany, Switzerland, as well as Australia and South America.

Today, Sicily is the Italian region with the highest number of expatriates:  as of 2017, 750,000 Sicilians, 14.4% of the island's population, lived abroad.  For lack of employment, every year many Sicilians, especially young graduates, still leave the island to seek jobs abroad. Today, an estimated 10 million people of Sicilian origins live around the world.

Largest cities 
These are the ten largest cities of Sicily:

Religion 

As in most Italian regions, Roman Catholicism is the predominant religious denomination in Sicily, and the church still plays an important role in the lives of most people. There is also a notable small minority of Eastern-rite Byzantine Catholics which has a mixed congregation of ethnic Albanians; it is operated by the Italo-Albanian Catholic Church. Most people still attend church weekly or at least for religious festivals, and many people get married in churches. There was a wide presence of Jews in Sicily for at least 1,400 years and possibly for more than 2,000 years. Some scholars believe that the Sicilian Jewry are partial ancestors of the Ashkenazi Jews. However, much of the Jewish community faded away when they were expelled from the island in 1492. Islam was present during the Emirate of Sicily, although Muslims were also expelled. Today, mostly due to immigration to the island, there are also several religious minorities, such as Jehovah's Witnesses, Hinduism, Islam, Judaism, and Sikhism. There are also a some Evangelical Christians who live on the island.

Politics

The politics of Sicily takes place in a framework of a presidential representative democracy, whereby the President of Regional Government is the head of government, and of a pluriform multi-party system. Executive power is exercised by the Regional Government. Legislative power is vested in both the government and the Sicilian Regional Assembly. The capital of Sicily is Palermo.

Traditionally, Sicily votes for centre-right parties during elections. From 1943-51, there was also a separatist political party called Sicilian Independence Movement (Movimento Indipendentista Siciliano, MIS). Their most successful result was at the 1946 general election, when MIS obtained 0.7% of national votes (8.8% of votes in Sicily), and four seats. However, the movement lost all their seats following the 1948 general election and the 1951 regional election. Even though it has never been formally disbanded, today the movement is no longer part of the politics of Sicily. After World War II, Sicily became a stronghold of the Christian Democracy, in opposition to the Italian Communist Party. The Communists and their successors (the Democratic Party of the Left, the Democrats of the Left and the present-day Democratic Party) had never won any seats in the region until 2012. Sicily is now governed by a centre-right coalition. Nello Musumeci is the current President and has served since 2017.

Administrative divisions

Administratively, Sicily is divided into nine provinces, each with a capital city of the same name as the province. Small surrounding islands are also part of various Sicilian provinces: the Aeolian Islands (Messina), isle of Ustica (Palermo), Aegadian Islands (Trapani), isle of Pantelleria (Trapani) and Pelagian Islands (Agrigento).

Economy

Thanks to regular growth in recent years, Sicily is the eighth largest regional economy of Italy in terms of total GDP (see List of Italian regions by GDP). A series of reforms and investments in agriculture, such as the introduction of modern irrigation systems, has made this important industry competitive. In the 1970s, some factories were opened, resulting in growth in the industrial sector. In recent years the service industry has become more important due to the opening of several shopping malls and some modest growth in financial and telecommunication activities. Tourism is an important source of income for the island, which attracts visitors due to its rich natural and historical heritage. Today Sicily is investing a large amount of money into the development of its hospitality industry, to attract even more tourism. However, Sicily continues to have a GDP per capita below the Italian average, and higher unemployment than the rest of Italy. This difference is mostly caused by the negative influence of the Mafia, which is still active in some areas, although it is much weaker than in the past.

Agriculture

Sicily has long been noted for its fertile soil, which is the result of past volcanic eruptions. The local agriculture is also helped by the pleasant climate of the island. The main agricultural products are wheat, citrons, oranges (Arancia Rossa di Sicilia IGP), lemons, tomatoes (Pomodoro di Pachino IGP), olives, olive oil, artichokes, prickly pear (Fico d'India dell'Etna DOP), almonds, grapes, pistachios (Pistacchio di Bronte DOP) and wine. Cattle and sheep are raised. The production of cheese is particularly important thanks to the Ragusano DOP and the Pecorino Siciliano DOP. Ragusa is noted for its honey (Miele Ibleo) and chocolate (Cioccolato di Modica IGP) products.

Sicily is the third largest wine producer in Italy, after Veneto and Emilia Romagna (and Italy is the world's largest wine producer). The region is known mainly for fortified Marsala wines. In recent decades the wine industry has improved, new winemakers are experimenting with less-well-known native varieties, and Sicilian wines have become better known. The best known local variety is Nero d'Avola, named for a small town not far from Syracuse; the best wines made with these grapes come from Noto, a famous old city close to Avola. Other important native varieties are: Nerello Mascalese, used to make the Etna Rosso DOC wine; Frappato, a component of the Cerasuolo di Vittoria DOCG wine; Moscato di Pantelleria (also known as Zibibbo), which is used to make different Pantelleria wines; Malvasia di Lipari, used for the Malvasia di Lipari DOC wine; and Catarratto, mostly used to make a white wine, Alcamo DOC. Furthermore, in Sicily, high-quality wines are also produced using non-native varieties like Syrah, Chardonnay and Merlot.

Sicily is also known for its liqueurs, such as Amaro Averna, produced in Caltanissetta, and the local limoncello.

Fishing is another fundamental resource for Sicily. It has important tuna, sardine, swordfish and European anchovy fisheries. Mazara del Vallo is the largest fishing centre in Sicily and one of the most important in Italy.

Industry and manufacturing

Improvements in Sicily's road system have helped to promote industrial development. The region has three important industrial districts:
 Catania Industrial District, where there are several food industries and one of the best European electronics industry centres called Etna Valley (in honour of the best known Silicon Valley) which contains offices and factories of international companies such as STMicroelectronics and Numonyx;
 Syracuse Petrochemical District with chemical industries, oil refineries and important power stations (as the innovative Archimede combined cycle power plant);
 the latest Enna Industrial District in which there are food industries.
In Palermo there are important shipyards (such as Fincantieri), mechanical factories of famous Italian companies as Ansaldo Breda, publishing and textile industries. Chemical industries are also in the Province of Messina (Milazzo) and in the Province of Caltanissetta (Gela).
There are petroleum, natural gas and asphalt fields in the Southeast (mostly near Ragusa) and massive deposits of halite in Central Sicily. The Province of Trapani is one of the largest sea salt producers in Italy.

Statistics

GDP growth
A table showing Sicily's different GDP (nominal and per capita) growth between 2000 and 2008:

Economic sectors
After the table which shows Sicily's GDP growth, this table shows the sectors of the Sicilian economy in 2006:

Unemployment rate 
The unemployment rate stood at 21.5% in 2018 and was one of the highest in Italy and Europe.

Transport

Roads

Highways have been built and expanded in the last four decades. The most prominent Sicilian roads are the motorways (known as ) in the north of the island. Much of the motorway network is elevated on pillars due to the island's mountainous terrain. Other main roads in Sicily are the Strade Statali, such as the SS.113 that connects Trapani to Messina (via Palermo), the SS.114 Messina-Syracuse (via Catania) and the SS.115 Syracuse-Trapani (via Ragusa, Gela and Agrigento).

Railways

The first railway in Sicily was opened in 1863 (Palermo-Bagheria) and today all of the Sicilian provinces are served by a network of railway services, linking to most major cities and towns; this service is operated by Trenitalia. Of the narrow-gauge railways the Ferrovia Circumetnea is the only one that still operates, going round Mount Etna. From the major cities of Sicily, there are services to Naples, Rome and Milan; this is achieved by the trains being loaded onto ferries which cross the Strait.

In Catania there is an underground railway service (metropolitana di Catania); in Palermo the national railway operator Trenitalia operates a commuter rail (Palermo metropolitan railway service), the Sicilian Capital is also served by 4 AMAT (Comunal Public Transport Operator) tramlines; Messina is served by a tramline.

Airports

Mainland Sicily has several airports that serve numerous Italian and European destinations and some extra-European.
 Catania-Fontanarossa Airport, located on the east coast, is the busiest on the island (and one of the busiest in all of Italy).
 Palermo International Airport, which is also a substantially large airport with many national and international flights.
 Trapani-Birgi Airport, a military-civil joint-use airport (third for traffic on the island). Recently the airport has seen an increase in traffic thanks to a low-cost carrier.
 Comiso-Ragusa Airport, has recently been refurbished and re-converted from military use to a civil airport. It was opened to commercial traffic and general aviation on 30 May 2013.
 Palermo-Boccadifalco Airport is the old airport of Palermo and is currently used for general aviation and as a base for the Guardia di Finanza and police helicopters.
 NAS Sigonella Airport, it is an Italian Air Force and US Navy installation.
 Lampedusa Airport.
 Pantelleria Airport.

Ports

By sea, Sicily is served by several ferry routes and cargo ports, and in all major cities, cruise ships dock on a regular basis.
 Mainland Italy: Ports connecting to the mainland are Messina (route to Villa San Giovanni and Salerno), the busiest passenger port in Italy, Palermo (routes to Genoa, Civitavecchia and Naples) and Catania (route to Naples).
 Sicily's small surrounding islands: The port of Milazzo serves the Aeolian Islands, the ports of Trapani and Marsala the Aegadian Islands and the port of Porto Empedocle the Pelagie Islands. From Palermo there is a service to the island of Ustica and to Sardinia.
 International connections: From Palermo and Trapani there are weekly services to Tunisia and there is also a daily service between Malta and Pozzallo.
 Commercial and cargo ports: The port of Augusta is the fifth-largest cargo port in Italy and handles tonnes of goods. Other major cargo ports are Palermo, Catania, Trapani, Pozzallo and Termini Imerese.
 Touristic ports: Several ports along the Sicilian coast are in the service of private boats that need to moor on the island. The main ports for this traffic are in Marina di Ragusa, Riposto, Portorosa, Syracuse, Cefalù and Sciacca. In Sicily, Palermo is also a major centre for boat rental, with or without crew, in the Mediterranean.
 Fishing ports: Like all islands, Sicily also has many fishing ports. The most important is in Mazara del Vallo followed by Castellamare del Golfo, Licata, Scoglitti and Portopalo di Capo Passero.

Planned bridge

Plans for a bridge linking Sicily to the mainland have been discussed since 1865. Throughout the last decade, plans were developed for a road and rail link to the mainland via what would be the world's longest suspension bridge, the Strait of Messina Bridge. Planning for the project has experienced several false starts over the past few years. On 6 March 2009, Silvio Berlusconi's government declared that the construction works for the Messina Bridge would begin on 23 December 2009, and announced a pledge of €1.3 billion as a contribution to the bridge's total cost, estimated at €6.1 billion.
The plan has been criticized by environmental associations and some local Sicilians and Calabrians, concerned with its environmental impact, economical sustainability and even possible infiltrations by organized crime.

Tourism

Sicily's sunny, dry climate, scenery, cuisine, history, and architecture attract many tourists from mainland Italy and abroad. The tourist season peaks in the summer months, although people visit the island all year round. Mount Etna, the beaches, the archaeological sites, and major cities such as Palermo, Catania, Syracuse and Ragusa are the favourite tourist destinations, but the old town of Taormina and the neighbouring seaside resort of Giardini Naxos draw visitors from all over the world, as do the Aeolian Islands, Erice, Castellammare del Golfo, Cefalù, Agrigento, the Pelagie Islands and Capo d'Orlando. The last features some of the best-preserved temples of the ancient Greek period. Many Mediterranean cruise ships stop in Sicily, and many wine tourists also visit the island.

Some scenes of several Hollywood and Cinecittà films were shot in Sicily. This increased the attraction of Sicily as a tourist destination.

UNESCO World Heritage Sites

There are seven UNESCO World Heritage Sites on Sicily. By the order of inscription:
 Valle dei Templi (1997) is one of the most outstanding examples of Greater Greece art and architecture, and is one of the main attractions of Sicily as well as a national monument of Italy. The site is located in Agrigento.
 Villa Romana del Casale (1997) is a Roman villa built in the first quarter of the 4th century and located about  outside the town of Piazza Armerina. It contains the richest, largest and most complex collection of Roman mosaics in the world.
 Aeolian Islands (2000) are a volcanic archipelago in the Tyrrhenian Sea, named after the demigod of the winds Aeolus. The Aeolian Islands are a tourist destination in the summer, and attract up to 200,000 visitors annually.
 Late Baroque Towns of the Val di Noto (2002) "represent the culmination and final flowering of Baroque art in Europe". It includes several towns: Caltagirone, Militello in Val di Catania, Catania, Modica, Noto, Palazzolo Acreide, Ragusa and Scicli.
 Necropolis of Pantalica (2005) is a large Necropolis in Sicily with over 5,000 tombs dating from the 13th to the 7th centuries BC. Syracuse is notable for its rich Greek history, culture, amphitheatres and architecture. They are situated in south-eastern Sicily.
 Mount Etna (2013) is one of the most active volcanoes in the world and is in an almost constant state of activity and generated myths, legends and naturalistic observation from Greek, Celts and Roman classic and medieval times.
 Arab-Norman Palermo and the cathedral churches of Cefalù and Monreale; includes a series of nine civil and religious structures dating from the era of the Norman kingdom of Sicily (1130–1194)

Tentative Sites

 Taormina and Isola Bella;
 Motya and Libeo Island: The Phoenician-Punic Civilisation in Italy;
 Scala dei Turchi;
 Strait of Messina.

Archeological sites
Because many different cultures settled, dominated or invaded the island, Sicily has a huge variety of archaeological sites. Also, some of the most notable and best preserved temples and other structures of the Greek world are located in Sicily. Here is a short list of the major archaeological sites:
 Sicels/Sicans/Elymians/Greeks: Segesta, Eryx, Cava Ispica, Thapsos, Pantalica;
 Greeks: Syracuse, Agrigento, Segesta, Selinunte, Gela, Kamarina, Himera, Megara Hyblaea, Naxos, Heraclea Minoa;
 Phoenicians: Motya, Soluntum, Marsala, Palermo;
 Romans: Piazza Armerina, Centuripe, Taormina, Palermo;
 Arabs: Palermo, Mazara del Vallo.
The excavation and restoration of one of Sicily's best known archaeological sites, the Valley of the Temples in Agrigento, was at the direction of the archaeologist Domenico Antonio Lo Faso Pietrasanta, Fifth Duke of Serradifalco, known in archaeological circles simply as "Serradifalco". He also oversaw the restoration of ancient sites at Segesta, Selinunte, Siracusa and Taormina.

Castles
In Sicily there are hundreds of castles, the most relevant are:

Coastal towers
The Coastal towers in Sicily (Torri costiere della Sicilia) are 218 old watchtowers along the coast. In Sicily, the first coastal towers date back to 1313 and 1345 of the Aragonese monarchy. From 1360 the threat came from the south, from North Africa to Maghreb, mainly to Barbary pirates and corsairs of Barbary Coast. In 1516, the Turks settled in Algiers, and from 1520, the corsair Hayreddin Barbarossa under the command of Ottoman Empire, operated from that harbour.

Most existing towers were built on architectural designs of the Florentine architect Camillo Camilliani from [1583] to 1584 and involved the coastal periple of Sicily. The typology changed completely in '800, because of the new higher fire volumes of cannon vessels, the towers were built on the type of Martello towers that the British built in the UK and elsewhere in the British Empire. 
The decline of Mediterranean piracy caused by the Second Barbary War led to a smaller number of coastal towers built during the 19th Century.

Culture

Sicily has long been associated with the arts; many poets, writers, philosophers, intellectuals, architects and painters have roots on the island. The history of prestige in this field can be traced back to Greek philosopher Archimedes, a Syracuse native who has gone on to become renowned as one of the greatest mathematicians of all time. Gorgias and Empedocles are two other highly noted early Sicilian-Greek philosophers, while the Syracusan-Greek Epicharmus is held to be the inventor of comedy.

Art and architecture

Baglio are traditional living structures in Western Sicily.

Ceramics 
Terracotta ceramics from the island are well known, the art of ceramics on Sicily goes back to the original ancient peoples named the Sicanians, it was then perfected during the period of Greek colonisation and is still prominent and distinct to this day. Nowadays, Caltagirone is one of the most important centres in Sicily for the artistic production of ceramics and terra-cotta sculptures. Famous painters include Renaissance artist Antonello da Messina, Pietro Novelli, Bruno Caruso, Renato Guttuso and Greek born Giorgio de Chirico who is commonly dubbed the "father of Surrealist art" and founder of the metaphysical art movement. The most noted architects are Filippo Juvarra (one of the most important figures of the Italian Baroque) and Ernesto Basile.

Sicilian Baroque

The Sicilian Baroque has a unique architectural identity. Noto, Caltagirone, Catania, Ragusa, Modica, Scicli and particularly Acireale contain some of Italy's best examples of Baroque architecture, carved in the local red sandstone. Noto provides one of the best examples of the Baroque architecture brought to Sicily.
The Baroque style in Sicily was largely confined to buildings erected by the church, and palazzi built as private residences for the Sicilian aristocracy. The earliest examples of this style in Sicily lacked individuality and were typically heavy-handed pastiches of buildings seen by Sicilian visitors to Rome, Florence, and Naples. However, even at this early stage, provincial architects had begun to incorporate certain vernacular features of Sicily's older architecture. By the middle of the 18th century, when Sicily's Baroque architecture was noticeably different from that of the mainland, it has a unique freedom of design that is difficult to characterize in words.

Music and film

Palermo hosts the Teatro Massimo which is the largest opera house in Italy and the third largest in all of Europe.
In Catania there is another important opera house, the Teatro Massimo Bellini with 1,200 seats, which is considered one of the best European opera houses for its acoustics.
Sicily's composers vary from Vincenzo Bellini, Sigismondo d'India, Giovanni Pacini and Alessandro Scarlatti, to contemporary composers such as Salvatore Sciarrino and Silvio Amato.

Many award-winning and acclaimed films of Italian cinema have been filmed in Sicily, amongst the most noted of which are: Visconti's "La Terra Trema" and "Il Gattopardo", Pietro Germi's "Divorzio all'Italiana" and "Sedotta e Abbandonata", Tornatore's "Cinema Paradiso".

Literature

The golden age of Sicilian poetry began in the early 13th century with the Sicilian School of Giacomo da Lentini, which was highly influential on Italian literature. Some of the most noted figures among writers and poets are Luigi Pirandello (Nobel laureate, 1934), Salvatore Quasimodo (Nobel laureate, 1959), Giovanni Verga (the father of the Italian Verismo), Domenico Tempio, Giovanni Meli, Luigi Capuana, Mario Rapisardi, Federico de Roberto, Leonardo Sciascia, Vitaliano Brancati, Giuseppe Tomasi di Lampedusa, Elio Vittorini, Vincenzo Consolo and Andrea Camilleri (noted for his novels and short stories with the fictional character Inspector Salvo Montalbano as protagonist). On the political side notable philosophers include Gaetano Mosca and Giovanni Gentile who wrote The Doctrine of Fascism.

Language

Today in Sicily most people are bilingual and speak both Italian and Sicilian, a distinct and historical Romance language. Some of the Sicilian words are loan words from Greek, Catalan, French, Arabic, Spanish and other languages. Dialects related to Sicilian are also spoken in Calabria and Salento; it had a significant influence on the Maltese language. However, the use of Sicilian is limited to informal contexts (mostly in family) and in a majority of cases it is replaced by the so-called regional Italian of Sicily, an Italian dialect that is a kind of mix between Italian and Sicilian.

Sicilian was an early influence in the development of the first Italian standard, although its use remained confined to an intellectual elite. This was a literary language in Sicily created under the auspices of Frederick II and his court of notaries, or Magna Curia, which, headed by Giacomo da Lentini, also gave birth to the Sicilian School, widely inspired by troubadour literature. Its linguistic and poetic heritage was later assimilated into the Florentine by Dante Alighieri, the father of modern Italian who, in his , claims that "In effect, this vernacular seems to deserve higher praise than the others since all the poetry written by Italians can be called Sicilian". It is in this language that appeared the first sonnet, whose invention is attributed to Giacomo da Lentini himself.

Science
Catania has one of the four laboratories of the Istituto Nazionale di Fisica Nucleare (National Institute for Nuclear Physics) in which there is a cyclotron that uses protons both for nuclear physics experiments and for particle therapy to treat cancer (proton therapy). Noto has one of the largest radio telescopes in Italy that performs geodetic and astronomical observations. There are observatories in Palermo and Catania, managed by the Istituto Nazionale di Astrofisica (National Institute for Astrophysics).

Syracuse is also an experimental centre for solar technologies through the creation of the project Archimede solar power plant that is the first concentrated solar power plant to use molten salt for heat transfer and storage which is integrated with a combined-cycle gas facility. All the plant is owned and operated by Enel. The touristic town of Erice is also an important science place thanks to the Ettore Majorana Foundation and Centre for Scientific Culture which
embraces 123 schools from all over the world, covering all branches of science, offering courses, seminars, workshops, and annual meetings. It was founded by the physicist Antonino Zichichi in honour of another scientist of the island, Ettore Majorana known for the Majorana equation and Majorana fermions. Sicily's famous scientists include also Stanislao Cannizzaro (chemist), Giovanni Battista Hodierna and Niccolò Cacciatore (astronomers).

Education
Sicily has four universities:
 The University of Catania dates back to 1434 and it is the oldest university in Sicily. Nowadays it hosts 12 faculties and over 62,000 students and it offers undergraduate and postgraduate programs. Catania hosts also the Scuola Superiore, an academic institution linked to the University of Catania, aiming for excellence in education.
 The University of Palermo is the island's second-oldest university. It was officially founded in 1806, although historical records indicate that medicine and law have been taught there since the late 15th century. The Orto botanico di Palermo (Palermo botanical gardens) is home to the university's Department of Botany and is also open to visitors.
 The University of Messina, founded in 1548 by Ignatius of Loyola. It is organized in 11 Faculties.
 The Kore University of Enna founded in 1995, is the latest Sicilian university and the first university founded in Sicily after the Italian Unification.

Cuisine

The island has a long history of producing a variety of noted cuisines and wines, to the extent that Sicily is sometimes nicknamed God's Kitchen because of this. Every part of Sicily has its speciality (e.g. Cassata is typical of Palermo although available everywhere in Sicily, as is Granita). The ingredients are typically rich in taste while remaining affordable to the general public. The savoury dishes of Sicily are viewed to be healthy, using fresh vegetables and fruits, such as tomatoes, artichokes, olives (including olive oil), citrus, apricots, aubergines, onions, beans, raisins commonly coupled with seafood, freshly caught from the surrounding coastlines, including tuna, sea bream, sea bass, cuttlefish, swordfish, sardines, and others.

The most well-known part of Sicilian cuisine is the rich sweet dishes including ice creams and pastries. Cannoli (singular: cannolo), a tube-shaped shell of fried pastry dough filled with a sweet filling usually containing ricotta, is strongly associated with Sicily worldwide. Biancomangiare, biscotti ennesi (cookies native to Enna), braccilatte (a Sicilian version of doughnuts), buccellato, ciarduna, pignoli, Biscotti Regina, giurgiulena, frutta martorana, cassata, pignolata, granita, cuccidati (a variety of fig cookie; also known as buccellati) and cuccìa are some notable sweet dishes.

Like the cuisine of the rest of southern Italy, pasta plays an important part in Sicilian cuisine, as does rice; for example with arancini. As well as using some other cheeses, Sicily has spawned some of its own, using both cow's and sheep's milk, such as pecorino and caciocavallo. Spices used include saffron, nutmeg, clove, pepper, and cinnamon, which were introduced by the Arabs. Parsley is used abundantly in many dishes. Although Sicilian cuisine is commonly associated with sea food, meat dishes, including goose, lamb, goat, rabbit, and turkey, are also found in Sicily. It was the Normans and Swabians who first introduced a fondness for meat dishes to the island. Some varieties of wine are produced from vines that are relatively unique to the island, such as the Nero d'Avola made near the baroque town of Noto.

Sports

The most popular sport in Sicily is football, which came to the fore in the late 19th century under the influence of the English. Some of the oldest football clubs in Italy are from Sicily: the three most successful are Palermo, Catania, and Messina, which have played 29, 17 and 5 seasons in the Serie A respectively. No club from Sicily has ever won Serie A, but football is still deeply embedded in local culture and all over Sicily most towns have a representative team.

Palermo and Catania have a heated rivalry and compete in the Sicilian derby together. Palermo is the only team in Sicily to have played on the European stage, in the UEFA Cup. In the island, the most noted footballer is Salvatore Schillaci, who won the Golden Boot at the 1990 FIFA World Cup with Italy. Other noted players include Giuseppe Furino, Pietro Anastasi, Francesco Coco, Christian Riganò, and Roberto Galia. There have also been some noted managers from the island, such as Carmelo Di Bella and Franco Scoglio.

Although football is the most popular sport in Sicily, the island also has participants in other fields. Amatori Catania have competed in the top Italian national rugby union league called National Championship of Excellence. They have even participated at the European level in the European Challenge Cup. Competing in the basketball variation of Serie A is Orlandina Basket from Capo d'Orlando in the province of Messina, where the sport has a reasonable following. Various other sports that are played to some extent include volleyball, handball, and water polo. Previously, in motorsport, Sicily held the prominent Targa Florio sports car race that took place in the Madonie Mountains, with the start-finish line in Cerda. The event was started in 1906 by Sicilian industrialist and automobile enthusiast Vincenzo Florio, and ran until it was canceled due to safety concerns in 1977.

From 28 September to 9 October 2005 Trapani was the location of Acts 8 and 9 of the Louis Vuitton Cup. This sailing race featured, among other entrants, all boats that took part in the 2007 America's Cup.

Popular culture

Each town and city has its own patron saint, and the feast days are marked by colourful processions through the streets with marching bands and displays of fireworks.

Sicilian religious festivals also include the presepe vivente (living nativity scene), which takes place at Christmas time. Deftly combining religion and folklore, it is a constructed mock 19th-century Sicilian village, complete with a nativity scene, and has people of all ages dressed in the costumes of the period, some impersonating the Holy Family, and others working as artisans of their particular assigned trade. It is normally concluded on Epiphany, often highlighted by the arrival of the magi on horseback.

Oral tradition plays a large role in Sicilian folklore. Many stories passed down from generation to generation involve a character named "Giufà". Anecdotes from this character's life preserve Sicilian culture as well as convey moral messages.

Sicilians also enjoy outdoor festivals, held in the local square or piazza where live music and dancing are performed on stage, and food fairs or sagre are set up in booths lining the square. These offer various local specialties, as well as typical Sicilian food. Normally these events are concluded with fireworks. A noted sagra is the Sagra del Carciofo or Artichoke Festival, which is held annually in Ramacca in April. The most important traditional event in Sicily is the carnival. Famous carnivals are in Acireale, Misterbianco, Regalbuto, Paternò, Sciacca, Termini Imerese.

The Opera dei Pupi (Opera of the Puppets; Sicilian: Òpira dî pupi) is a marionette theatrical representation of Frankish romantic poems such as the Song of Roland or Orlando furioso that is one of the characteristic cultural traditions of Sicily. The sides of donkey carts are decorated with intricate, painted scenes; these same tales are enacted in traditional puppet theatres featuring hand-made marionettes of wood. The opera of the puppets and the Sicilian tradition of cantastorî (singers of tales) are rooted in the Provençal troubadour tradition in Sicily during the reign of Frederick II, Holy Roman Emperor, in the first half of the 13th century. A great place to see this marionette art is the puppet theatres of Palermo. The Sicilian marionette theatre Opera dei Pupi was proclaimed in 2001 and inscribed in 2008 in the UNESCO Intangible Cultural Heritage Lists.

Today, there are only a few troupes that maintain the tradition. They often perform for tourists. However, there are no longer the great historical families of marionettists, such as the Greco of Palermo; the Canino of Partinico and Alcamo; Crimi, Trombetta and Napoli of Catania, Pennisi and Macri of Acireale, Profeta of Licata, Gargano and Grasso of Agrigento. One can, however, admire the richest collection of marionettes at the Museo Internazionale delle Marionette Antonio Pasqualino and at the Museo Etnografico Siciliano Giuseppe Pitrè in Palermo. Other elaborate marionettes are on display at the Museo Civico Vagliasindi in Randazzo.

Traditional items

The Sicilian cart is an ornate, colourful style of a horse- or donkey-drawn cart native to Sicily. Sicilian woodcarver George Petralia states that horses were mostly used in the city and flat plains, while donkeys or mules were more often used in rough terrain for hauling heavy loads. The cart has two wheels and is primarily handmade out of wood with iron components.

The Sicilian coppola is a traditional kind of flat cap typically worn by men in Sicily. First used by English nobles during the late 18th century, the tascu began being used in Sicily in the early 20th century as a driving cap, usually worn by car drivers. The coppola is usually made in tweed. Today it is widely regarded as a definitive symbol of Sicilian heritage.

Flag and emblem

The Flag of Sicily, regarded as a regional icon, was first adopted in 1282, after the Sicilian Vespers of Palermo. It is characterised by the presence of the triskeles in the middle, depicting the head of Medusa and three wheat ears representing the extreme fertility of the land of Sicily. In early mythology, when Medusa was slain and beheaded by Perseus, the Medusa head was placed in the centre of Athena's shield. Palermo and Corleone were the first two cities to found a confederation against the Angevin rule. The triskeles symbol came to be on the Sicilian flag in 1943 during World War II when Andrea Finocchiaro Aprile led an independence movement, in collaboration with the allies. Their plan was to help Sicily become independent and form a free republic. The colours, likewise introduced in the 1940s, respectively represent the cities of Palermo and Corleone. The separatist behind the movement used a yellow and red flag with the Trinacria in the centre of it. When World War II ended, Sicily was recognized as an autonomous region in the Italian Republic.

The flag became the official public flag of the Regione Siciliana in January 2000, after the passing of an apposite regional law which advocates its use on public buildings, schools and city halls along with the national Italian flag and the European one.

Familiar as an ancient symbol of the region, the Triskelion is also featured on Greek coins of Syracuse, such as coins of Agathocles (317–289 BC).The symbol dates back to when Sicily was part of Magna Graecia, the colonial extension of Greece beyond the Aegean. The triskelion was revived, as a neoclassic – and non-Bourbon – emblem for the new Napoleonic Kingdom of the Two Sicilies, by Joachim Murat in 1808. In the case of Sicily, the triskelion symbol is said to represent the three capes (headlands or promontories of the island of Sicily, namely: Pelorus (Peloro, Tip of Faro, Messina: North-East); Pachynus (Passero, Syracuse: South); and Lilybæum (Lilibeo, Cape Boeo, Marsala: West), which form three points of a triangle.

See also
 List of islands of Italy
 List of people from Sicily

References

Further reading

 Alio, Jacqueline (2018) Sicilian Studies: A Guide and Syllabus for Educators (Trinacria Editions, New York).
 Bonacini, Elisa (2007) Il territorio calatino nella Sicilia imperiale e tardoromana (British Archeological Reports, International Series: 1694) Archaeopress, Oxford, England, in Italian with abstract in English
 Chaney, Edward. (2000), "British and American Travellers in Sicily from the eighth to the twentieth century", The Evolution of the Grand Tour, Routledge.
 Leighton, Robert (1999) Sicily before History (Duckworth, London; Cornell University Press, Ithaca). 
 Mendola, Louis; Alio, Jacqueline (2013) The Peoples of Sicily: A Multicultural Legacy (Trinacria Editions, New York).
 Spadi, Fabio. (2001) "The Bridge on the Strait of Messina: 'Lowering' the Right of Innocent Passage?" International and Comparative Law Quarterly 50: 411 ff.
 "From Rome to Sicily: Plane or Train?" Expert Travel Advice, The New York Times, 7 February 2008 The New York Times.
Attilio L. Vinci, Magica Sicilia, Campo, Alcamo (Trapani), 2018. 
 
 
 
 To Noto: or London to Sicily in a Ford (London, 1989) by Duncan Fallowell

External links

 
 Sicilian Region — Official website 
 The Wonders of Sicily – The Cities, Architecture, Culture, History, People
 Piccolo, Salvatore (2018). Bronze Age Sicily. World History Encyclopedia.
 
 Piccolo, Salvatore (2018). The Dolmens of Sicily. World History Encyclopedia.

 
Former countries in Europe
Islands of Italy
Mediterranean
Mediterranean islands
NUTS 2 statistical regions of the European Union
Regions of Italy
Wine regions of Italy
Autonomous regions of Italy